The following is a list of important scholarly resources related to Andrew Jackson.

Biographies

  vol 1 online; vol 2 online
 ; 344 pages; coverage to age 21
 
 
 
 
 
 
 
 
 
 
 
 
 
 
 
 
  Abridgment of Remini's 3-volume biography.
 Remini, Robert V. "Andrew Jackson", American National Biography (2000).

Military

 
 Ratner, Lorman A. Andrew Jackson and His Tennessee Lieutenants: A Study in Political Culture (1997).

Indian removal

Bank War

 
 
 
 
 
 
 
  Winner of Pulitzer Prize for History. History of ideas of the era.
 Taylor, George Rogers, ed. Jackson Versus Biddle: The Struggle over the Second Bank of the United States (1949), excerpts from primary and secondary sources.

Petticoat affair

Presidential campaigns

 
 
 
 Parsons, Lynn H. The Birth of Modern Politics: Andrew Jackson, John Quincy Adams, and the Election of 1828 (2009) excerpt and text search

Other specialized studies

 
 
 
 Bugg Jr. James L. ed. Jacksonian Democracy: Myth or Reality? (1952), excerpts from scholars.
 
 
 
 Cheathem, Mark R., and Terry Corps, eds. Historical Dictionary of the Jacksonian Era and Manifest Destiny (Rowman & Littlefield, 2016).
 
 
 
 
 
 
  Chapter on Jackson.
 
  
 
 Latner Richard B. The Presidency of Andrew Jackson: White House Politics, 1820–1837 (1979), standard survey.
 
 
 {{cite book |last=Martin |first=François-Xavier |date=1829 |title=The History of Louisiana, from the Earliest Period, Vol. 2 |publisher=A.T. Penniman & Co. |location=New Orleans, LA}}
 Morgan, William G. “Henry Clay’s Biographers and the ‘Corrupt Bargain’ Charge.” Register of the Kentucky Historical Society 66#3 (1968), pp. 242–58. online
 Morgan, William G. “John Quincy Adams Versus Andrew Jackson: Their Biographers And The ‘Corrupt Bargain’ Charge.” Tennessee Historical Quarterly 26#1 (1967), pp. 43–58. online
 
 
 
 
 
 
 
 Schama, Simon. The American Future: A History (2008).
 
 Syrett, Harold C. Andrew Jackson: His Contribution to the American Tradition (1953). on Jacksonian democracy
 
 
 

Encyclopedias

 
 
 

Historiography

 
 
 
 Mabry, Donald J., Short Book Bibliography on Andrew Jackson, Historical Text Archive.
 Remini, Robert V. and Robert O. Rupp. Andrew Jackson: A Bibliography (Greenwood, 1991)
 
 Van Sledright, Bruce, and Peter Afflerbach. "Reconstructing Andrew Jackson: Prospective elementary teachers' readings of revisionist history texts". Theory & Research in Social Education 28#3 (2000): 411-444.
 Ward, John William. Andrew Jackson, Symbol for an Age'' (1955) Oxford University Press how writers saw him.

Papers and correspondence

   7 volumes total.
  (9 vols. 1980 to date)
  Reprints his major messages and reports.
  Library of Congress. "Andrew Jackson Papers", a digital archive that provides direct access to the manuscript images of many of the Jackson documents. online

Jackson, Andrew
Jackson, Andrew
Jackson, Andrew
Jackson, Andrew
Jackson, Andrew